The Canton of Rivière-Pilote is a former canton in the Arrondissement of Le Marin on Martinique. It had 12,680 inhabitants (2012). It was disbanded in 2015. The canton comprised the commune of Rivière-Pilote.

References

Cantons of Martinique